Dahivel is a town in Sakri Tehsil (Taluka), in Dhule District of state of Maharashtra. It is located on the state highway and National Highway 6; NH-6 - a busy freeway running between Hazira (near Surat-Gujarat) to Kolkata, (West Bengal) and another state highway towards Manmad-Solapur/Nasik and Nandurbar.

Dahivel is located on tel end of saihadri n 550 m average sea level surrounded by hills, mountains, Forest, trench, waterfalls make whether cool and comfortable. Its land of  river Kan basin is fertile and mostly irrigated. Agriculture and treading is imp profession. Maharashtra's largest solar power project (125 MW) and wind power project is located towards north 5 km. Development of 125 MW of solar power project is upcoming.
People are speaking Marathi and local Ahirani as well same of tribal languages such as bill, mavachi, Konkani, and vanjari.

Bhongoan is must visit place ( 2 km ) where temple complex dedicated to Lord Shiva on the bank of river Kan is built between 800 and 1000 years in " Hemadpanthi" style. It is an important but neglected site by Arcological Department of India as well tourism department of Maharashtra but maintained by local. Way to the north there is Malngoan dam (gross storage capacity is 13,023.00 km3). The famous shrine of Shri. Kanhayyalal Maharaj (temple) is located at Amli dedicated to Lord Vishnu in sheshavtara surrounded by lush green forest, trench (Aalal dari) and waterfall.

Location
Dahivel is located on the National Highway 6 (NH 6).
This village has two dams nearby called as Malangaon Dam.

Education facilities

Dahivel has three schools, ZP's(Municipal) Marathi School which has primary education facility up to 4th Standard,  Late Devrao Sonu Patil secondary and Higher Secondary School''' Dahivel i.e. from 5th Standard to 10th Standard and it also has Jr. College like 11th and 12th in all three streams (Arts, Science, Commerce) and the other School is Adarsh secondary and Higher Secondary School for education from 5th Standard to 10th Standard.

Dahivel has one Senior college which comes under North Maharashtra University called Uttamrao Patil Arts & Science College, Dahiwel.
Dahiwel has a hostel for all boys who come from small villages.

A computer institute named PUSHPAI Computers, Dahiwel is authorized By MKCL (Maharashtra Knowledge Corporation Limited Pune) for MS-CIT course.

Medical facilities
Dahivel has a number of private clinics and 5–6 medical shops present within the village. It has a larger government hospital i.e. primary health centre with a maternity ward attached to it, an ayurvedic dispensary and a veterinary dispensary is also there.

Recreation and cultural facilities
Dahivel has recreational facilities like cinemas within the village.

Men wear mostly white pants, white shirt with Gandhi Cap. Women are always in saree.

The villager are follows hindus culture and celebrate each hindu festivals.

Religion
Dahivel has two temples dedicated to Hanuman, two to Mahadev and one to Vitthal. One to Shree Swami Samarath (Dindori Pranit) and Ram Temple.

One of the ancient Shiva temples resides on the banks of river Kan
Every year there is one Big Function arranged called as Hari Nam Saptah'' where all the villagers will gather and donate rice, wheat or funds as per their wish.

Malangaon Dam is near very holy place Dhaner Aamali.  The Dhaner Aamali has Khanaiyala Temple which increases the beauty of this place, where in Aashad – Marathi month (Mostly comes in November) – there is arranged a big Mela, many peoples visit this place. In mela, there is lots of entertainment like stage plays called "Tamasha"; villagers are fond of it. Very famous are Kantabai satarkar and Bhika-Bhima.

Economy
The weekly bazar is held on Thursdays.
The main profession of the people from Dahivel is farming. There are three main seasons; Monsoon (rainy) season (June–July till September), and winter (November to April). Dahiwel gets very heavy rains every year.

The main crop is Corn, Onion, Wheat, bajara, harbara; other farm products include sugarcane.
Farmers also produce various vegetables and fruits. A notable fruit is grapes. There are many grapes gardens in the village. 
Rajendra welding works is a well known workshop in this village. He doing all types of mechanical agricultural jobs. He repairs all types of machinery.
A notable hotel in the village is Hotel Shivam – most delicious prestigious food quality with experience chefs and staff. The aim of hotel is "Athiti devo bhav".

References

Villages in Dhule district